Ben-Gurion's hut (Tzrif Ben Gurion) was the retirement home of Israeli Prime Minister David Ben-Gurion and his wife Paula (Pola) from 1953 until Ben-Gurion's death in 1973. The "hut", located on kibbutz Sde Boker, was preserved exactly as it was left by Ben-Gurion and now serves as a museum with a visitor's center operated by the Ben-Gurion Heritage Institute.

Ben-Gurion's move
In 1952, on a tour of Southern Israel, Ben-Gurion passed by a small community with only a hut and a few tents – Sde Boker. He stopped to greet the founders of the community, whom he believed were doing a great service to the newly-founded State by reclaiming the desert. Later, he sent a letter to the community wishing them luck and confiding in them his "jealousy" of their humble lifestyle.

In 1953, Ben-Gurion and his wife joined the kibbutz and moved into the house. His move can be attributed to Ben-Gurion's wish to settle the Negev desert and lead by personal example. Additionally, he wished to disconnect from the pressures of his job and move to a remote part of the desert.

Return to premiership
In 1955, Ben-Gurion was re-elected Prime Minister. Throughout his term which lasted until 1963, Ben-Gurion resided in his home in Sde Boker, and he continued living there until his death in 1973.

Today
Per Ben-Gurion's request in his will, the house and everything inside remained intact and open to the public. A museum documenting the life and writings of Ben-Gurion was built at the site of the hut and attracts many tourists each year. A special focus was put on Ben-Gurion's vision to build up and settle the Negev Desert.

See also

 Ben-Gurion House in Tel Aviv

Notes

External links 
 

Biographical museums in Israel
Commemoration of David Ben-Gurion
Kibbutzim
Museums in Southern District (Israel)